Dießenbach (also: Gönsbach) is a small brook and right tributary to the Kleebach brook in central Hesse, Germany. It flows into the Kleebach in Linden.

See also

List of rivers of Hesse

References

Rivers of Hesse
Rivers of the Taunus
Rivers of Germany